The 2014 United States House of Representatives elections in New Hampshire were held on Tuesday, November 4, 2014 to elect the two U.S. representatives from the state of New Hampshire, one from each of the state's two congressional districts. The elections coincided with the elections of other federal and state offices, including governor of New Hampshire and U.S. senator.
This election marked the first time since 1992 that New Hampshire elected members of two parties into the House of Representatives, and as of 2021, it is the most recent time a Republican has been elected to Congress in New Hampshire.

Overview
Results of the 2014 United States House of Representatives elections in New Hampshire by district:

District 1

The 1st district covers the southeastern part of the state and consists of three general areas: Greater Manchester, the Seacoast and the Lakes Region. The incumbent was Democrat Carol Shea-Porter, who has represented the district since 2013 and previously from 2007 to 2011. She was elected with 50% of the vote in 2012, defeating Republican incumbent Frank Guinta, and the district has a PVI of R+1.

Democratic primary

Candidates

Declared
 Carol Shea-Porter, incumbent U.S. Representative

Results

Republican primary

Candidates

Declared
 Frank Guinta, former U.S. Representative
 Daniel Innis, Dean of the Peter T. Paul College of Business and Economics at the University of New Hampshire
 Everett Jabour, trucking executive
 Brendan Kelly, former Seabrook Selectman, former chairman of the Libertarian Party of New Hampshire, and Libertarian nominee for this seat in 2012

Declined
 Jeb Bradley, Majority Leader of the New Hampshire Senate and former U.S. Representative
 John Cebrowski, state representative
 Christopher Sununu, Executive Councillor (running for re-election)
 Pam Tucker, state representative

Polling

Results

General election

Polling

Results

District 2

The 2nd district covers the western and northern parts of the state and includes the cities of Nashua and Concord. The incumbent is Democrat Ann McLane Kuster, who has represented the district since 2013. She was elected with 50% of the vote in 2012, defeating Republican incumbent Charles Bass, and the district has a PVI of D+3.

Democratic primary

Candidates

Declared
 Ann McLane Kuster, incumbent U.S. Representative

Results

Republican primary

Candidates

Declared
 Marilinda Garcia, state representative
 Gary Lambert, former state senator
 Jim Lawrence, former state representative
 Mike Little, former Concord City Councilor

Declined
 Andrew Hemingway, businessman, Tea Party activist and candidate for chairman of the New Hampshire Republican State Committee in 2013 (running for Governor)
 William L. O'Brien, former Speaker of the New Hampshire House of Representatives
 Christopher Sununu, Executive Councillor (running for re-election)

Polling

Results

General election

Polling

Results

See also
 2014 United States House of Representatives elections
 2014 United States elections

References

External links
U.S. House elections in New Hampshire, 2014 at Ballotpedia
Campaign contributions at OpenSecrets

New Hampshire
2014
United States House of Representatives